San Valentino Torio is a town and comune in the province of Salerno in the Campania region of south-west Italy. San Valentino Torio is   situated in the northern part of the province, not far from Mount Vesuvius, in the Sarno river valley.

San Valentino Torio occupies a predominantly agricultural area with cultivation of the typical vegetables of the region, such as the San Marzano tomato.

History

The first traces of human presence in the southern plain of Campania date to the ninth through sixth centuries BCE. These includes a necropolis with 1,400 tombs, attributed to the Sarrastri tribe. Samnites invaded the territory in 421 BCE.

The earliest mention of San Valentino (as Balentino) is from an 868 CE document, preserved in the Trinità della Cava abbey. Its territory was held by the Del Balzo and Capece Minutolo families until the abolition of feudalism in 1806. It assumed the current denomination after the unification of Italy, in 1861.

References

External links
 

Cities and towns in Campania